A thermodynamic potential (or more accurately, a thermodynamic potential energy) is a scalar quantity used to represent the thermodynamic state of a system. Just as in mechanics, where potential energy is defined as capacity to do work, similarly different potentials have different meanings. The concept of thermodynamic potentials was introduced by Pierre Duhem in 1886. Josiah Willard Gibbs in his papers used the term fundamental functions. 

One main thermodynamic potential that has a physical interpretation is the internal energy . It is the energy of configuration of a given system of conservative forces (that is why it is called potential) and only has meaning with respect to a defined set of references (or data). In other words, each thermodynamic potential is equivalent to other thermodynamic potentials; each potential is a different expression of the others. 

In thermodynamics, external forces, such as gravity, are counted as contributing to total energy rather than to thermodynamic potentials. For example, the working fluid in a steam engine sitting on top of Mount Everest has higher total energy due to gravity than it has at the bottom of the Mariana Trench, but the same thermodynamic potentials. This is because the gravitational potential energy belongs to the total energy rather than to thermodynamic potentials such as internal energy.

Description and interpretation 
Five common thermodynamic potentials are:

The set of all  are also included as natural variables but may be ignored when no chemical reactions are occurring which cause them to change. The Helmholtz free energy is in ISO/IEC standard called Helmholtz energy or Helmholtz function.

These five common potentials are all potential energies, but there are also entropy potentials. The thermodynamic square can be used as a tool to recall and derive some of the potentials.

Just as in mechanics, where potential energy is defined as capacity to do work, similarly different potentials have different meanings like the below:
 Internal energy is the capacity to do work plus the capacity to release heat.
 Gibbs energy is the capacity to do non-mechanical work.
 Enthalpy is the capacity to do non-mechanical work plus the capacity to release heat.
 Helmholtz energy is the capacity to do mechanical work plus non-mechanical work.
Thermodynamic potentials are very useful when calculating the equilibrium results of a chemical reaction, or when measuring the properties of materials in a chemical reaction. The chemical reactions usually take place under some constraints such as constant pressure and temperature, or constant entropy and volume, and when this is true, there is a corresponding thermodynamic potential that comes into play. Just as in mechanics, the system will tend towards a lower value of a potential and at equilibrium, under these constraints, the potential will take the unchanging minimum value. The thermodynamic potentials can also be used to estimate the total amount of energy available from a thermodynamic system under the appropriate constraint.

In particular: (see principle of minimum energy for a derivation)

 When the entropy  and "external parameters" (e.g. volume) of a closed system are held constant, the internal energy  decreases and reaches a minimum value at equilibrium. This follows from the first and second laws of thermodynamics and is called the principle of minimum energy. The following three statements are directly derivable from this principle.
 When the temperature  and external parameters of a closed system are held constant, the Helmholtz free energy  decreases and reaches a minimum value at equilibrium.
 When the pressure  and external parameters of a closed system are held constant, the enthalpy  decreases and reaches a minimum value at equilibrium.
 When the temperature , pressure  and external parameters of a closed system are held constant, the Gibbs free energy  decreases and reaches a minimum value at equilibrium.

Natural variables 
For each thermodynamic potential, there are thermodynamic variables that need to be held constant to specify the potential value at a thermodynamical equilibrium state, such as independent variables for a mathematical function. These variables are termed the natural variables of that potential. The natural variables are important not only to specify the potential value at the equalibrium, but also because if a thermodynamic potential can be determined as a function of its natural variables, all of the thermodynamic properties of the system can be found by taking partial derivatives of that potential with respect to its natural variables and this is true for no other combination of variables. If a thermodynamic potential is not given as a function of its natural variables, it will not, in general, yield all of the thermodynamic properties of the system.

An exception for this rule is the  −  conjugate pairs as there is no reason to ignore these in the thermodynamic potentials, and in fact we may additionally define the four potentials for each species. Using IUPAC notation in which the brackets contain the natural variables (other than the main four), we have:

If there is only one species, then we are done. If there are  dimensions to the thermodynamic space, then there are  unique thermodynamic potentials. For the most simple case, a single phase ideal gas, there will be three dimensions, yielding eight thermodynamic potentials.

The fundamental equations 

The definitions of the thermodynamic potentials may be differentiated and, along with the first and second laws of thermodynamics, a set of differential equations known as the fundamental equations follow. (Actually they are all expressions of the same fundamental thermodynamic relation, but are expressed in different variables.) By the first law of thermodynamics, any differential change in the internal energy  of a system can be written as the sum of heat flowing into the system subtracted by the work done by the system on the environment, along with any change due to the addition of new particles to the system:

(Neither  nor  are exact differentials, i.e., they are thermodynamic process path-dependent.

By the second law of thermodynamics, we can express the internal energy change in terms of state functions and their differentials. In case of reversible changes we have:

where
  is temperature,
  is entropy,
  is pressure,

This leads to the standard differential form of the internal energy in case of a quasistatic reversible change:

If the system has more external variables than just the volume that can change, the fundamental thermodynamic relation generalizes to:

Applying Legendre transforms repeatedly, the following differential relations hold for the four potentials (fundamental thermodynamic equations or fundamental thermodynamic relation):

The infinitesimals on the right-hand side of each of the above equations are of the natural variables of the potential on the left-hand side. Similar equations can be developed for all of the other thermodynamic potentials of the system. There will be one fundamental equation for each thermodynamic potential, resulting in a total of  fundamental equations.

The differences between the four thermodynamic potentials can be summarized as follows:

The equations of state 
We can use the above equations to derive some differential definitions of some thermodynamic parameters. If we define  to stand for any of the thermodynamic potentials, then the above equations are of the form:

From the chain rule it follows that:

where  is the set of all natural variables of  except  that are held as constants. This yields expressions for various thermodynamic parameters in terms of the derivatives of the potentials with respect to their natural variables. These equations are known as equations of state since they specify parameters of the thermodynamic state.

If we use all thermodynamic potentials, then we will have more equations of state such as

and so on. In all, if the thermodynamic space is  dimensions, then there will be  equations for each potential, resulting in a total of  equations of state because  thermodynamic potentials exist. If the  equations of state for a particular potential are known, then the fundamental equation for that potential (i.e., the exact differential of the thermodynamic potential) can be determined. This means that all thermodynamic information about the system will be known because the fundamental equations for any other potential can be found via the Legendre transforms and the corresponding equations of state for each potential as partial derivatives of the potential can also be found.

Measurement of thermodynamic potentials 

The above equations of state suggest methods to experimentally measure changes in the thermodynamic potentials using physically measurable parameters. For example the free energy expressions

and

can be integrated at constant temperature and quantities to obtain:

(at constant T, {Nj} )

(at constant T, {Nj} )

which can be measured by monitoring the measurable variables of pressure, temperature and volume. Changes in the enthalpy and internal energy can be measured by calorimetry (which measures the amount of heat ΔQ released or absorbed by a system). The expressions

can be integrated:

(at constant P, {Nj} )

(at constant V, {Nj} )

Note that these measurements are made at constant {Nj } and are therefore not applicable to situations in which chemical reactions take place.

The Maxwell relations 

We may take the "cross differentials" of the state equations,  which obey the following relationship:

From these we get the Maxwell relations. There will be  of them for each potential giving a total of  equations in all.

Using the equations of state involving the chemical potential we get equations such as:

and using the other potentials we can get equations such as:

Euler relations 
Since all of the natural variables of the internal energy  are extensive quantities

it follows from Euler's homogeneous function theorem that the internal energy can be written as:

From the equations of state, we then have:

This formula is known as an Euler relation, because Euler's theorem on homogeneous functions leads to it. (It was not discovered by Euler in an investigation of thermodynamics, which did not exist in his day.).

Substituting into the expressions for the other main potentials we have:

As in the above sections, this process can be carried out on all of the other thermodynamic potentials. Thus, there is another Euler relation, based on the expression of entropy as a function of internal energy and other extensive variables. Yet other Euler relations hold for other fundamental equations for energy or entropy, as respective functions of other state variables including some intensive state variables.

The Gibbs–Duhem relation 
Deriving the Gibbs–Duhem equation from basic thermodynamic state equations is straightforward. Equating any thermodynamic potential definition with its Euler relation expression yields:

Differentiating, and using the second law:

yields:

Which is the Gibbs–Duhem relation. The Gibbs–Duhem is a relationship among the intensive parameters of the system. It follows that for a simple system with  components, there will be  independent parameters, or degrees of freedom. For example, a simple system with a single component will have two degrees of freedom, and may be specified by only two parameters, such as pressure and volume for example. The law is named after Josiah Willard Gibbs and Pierre Duhem.

Stability Conditions 
As the internal energy is a convex function of entropy and volume, the stability condition requires that the second derivative of internal energy with entropy or volume to be positive. The same concept can be applied to the various thermodynamic potentials by identifying if they are convex or concave of respective their variables.

 and 

Where Helmholtz energy is a concave function of temperature and convex function of volume.

 and 

Where enthalpy is a concave function of pressure and convex function of entropy.

 and 

Where enthalpy is a concave function of both pressure and temperature. 

In general the thermodynamic potentials (the internal energy and its Legendre transforms), are convex functions of their extrinsic variables and concave functions of intrinsic variables. The stability conditions impose that isothermal compressibility is positive and that for non-negative temperature,  .

Chemical reactions 
Changes in these quantities are useful for assessing the degree to which a chemical reaction will proceed. The relevant quantity depends on the reaction conditions, as shown in the following table.  denotes the change in the potential and at equilibrium the change will be zero.

See also
 Coomber's relationship

Notes

References

Further reading
 McGraw Hill Encyclopaedia of Physics (2nd Edition), C.B. Parker, 1994, 
 Thermodynamics, From Concepts to Applications (2nd Edition), A. Shavit, C. Gutfinger, CRC Press (Taylor and Francis Group, USA), 2009, 
 Chemical Thermodynamics, D.J.G. Ives, University Chemistry, Macdonald Technical and Scientific, 1971, 
 Elements of Statistical Thermodynamics (2nd Edition), L.K. Nash, Principles of Chemistry, Addison-Wesley, 1974, 
 Statistical Physics (2nd Edition), F. Mandl, Manchester Physics, John Wiley & Sons, 2008,

External links
 Thermodynamic Potentials – Georgia State University
 Chemical Potential Energy: The 'Characteristic' vs the Concentration-Dependent Kind

Thermodynamics
Potentials
Thermodynamic equations